Royston William Langdon (born 1 May 1972) is an English musician who is the lead singer and bassist of the English-American glam rock band Spacehog.

Early life
Langdon was born on 1 May 1972 in Leeds. When he was young, he and his older brother Antony joined the Leeds Parish Church choir; the two of them would later found Spacehog in 1994, with Antony playing rhythm guitar in the band. Langdon wanted to become a photographer and artist and dreamed of attending Saint Martin's School of Art in London. At the age of 16, he was kicked out of school. Shortly after Spacehog was formed, Langdon came to New York City, where he met Bryce Goggin; the two became friends, and Goggin would later produce Spacehog's best known song, "In the Meantime".

Personal life
From 25 March 2003 to April 2008 he was married to actress Liv Tyler, with whom he has a son, Milo William Langdon (born 14 December 2004).

References

1972 births
Musicians from Leeds
British bass guitarists
Male bass guitarists
Living people
British alternative rock musicians
21st-century English bass guitarists
21st-century British male musicians